Appleby is an unincorporated community in Codington County, in the U.S. state of South Dakota.

History
A post office called Appleby was established in 1884, and remained in operation until it was discontinued in 1897. The community was named for John Appleby, the inventor of a popular grain binder.

References

Unincorporated communities in Codington County, South Dakota
Unincorporated communities in South Dakota